Yokasta Galeth Valle Álvarez (born 28 August 1992) is a Nicaraguan-born Costa Rican professional boxer. She is a world champion in two weight classes, having held the IBF female mini flyweight title since 2019 and previously the IBF female junior mini flyweight title in 2016. She has also challenged once for the WBO female junior flyweight title in 2017 and once for the WBC female mini flyweight title in 2018. As of May 2020, she is ranked as the world's fourth best active female mini flyweight by BoxRec.

Early life
Born on 28 August 1992 in Matagalpa, Nicaragua, Valle moved to Costa Rica when she was seven years old. Valle holds Costa Rican nationality and, thus, represents Costa Rica, but has stated that she represents Costa Rica and Nicaragua due to her origins.

Valle started practicing volleyball, and later moved to boxing due to her father's influence. Her first fight was when she was 13 years old.

Professional career
Valle debuted on 26 July 2014 in Alajuela, defeating Mexican boxer Guadalupe "La Fiera" Atilano by unanimous decision.

On 1 December 2017, Valle fought for the WBO female light flyweight title against Japanese Naoko Fujioka, but she lost by unanimous decision in ten rounds. This was also Valle's first defeat in her professional career.

In 2018, Valle was named Tina Rupprecht's rival for the vacant WBC minimumweight world championship, after reigning champion Momo Koseki retired. Valle lost against the German, in a fight taking place in Munich on 16 June 2018 by unanimous decision, this was her second career loss.

On 4 August 2019, Valle fought Joana Pastrana for the IBF mini flyweight world championship title, in a bout held at Marbella. Valle won the fight by split decision, becoming the new mini flyweight female world champion.

Professional boxing record

Personal life
Valle participated in the 2018 Costa Rican version of Dancing with the Stars.

External links

References

1992 births
Living people
Mini-flyweight boxers
Costa Rican women boxers
International Boxing Federation champions
Costa Rican people of Nicaraguan descent
Nicaraguan emigrants to Costa Rica